Abdulla Yusuf Abdulrahim Mohamed Helal (born 12 June 1993) is a Bahraini professional footballer who plays as a forward for Persija Jakarta and the Bahrain national team.

Club career
Helal played for East Riffa since 2009. Through this journey he joined Al-Muharraq SC on loan from his club. He won the Bahraini Premier League in the 2017–18 season with Al-Muharraq.

Bohemians
On 19 July 2018, it was announced that he would join Czech First League club Bohemians 1905 on loan and become the first Bahraini player to join a European top division club. On 28 July 2018, Helal played his first game with the club after coming on as a substitute in the 65th minute. He scored a goal and provided an assist in an eventual 4–2 loss at Příbram.

Slavia Prague
On 4 January 2019, Slavia Prague announced the signing of Helal from Bohemians 1905, and loaned him out for the rest of the season. On 17 September 2019, Helal entered the history again by being the first player from the GCC countries to participate in a 2019–20 UEFA Champions League match against Internazionale.

Slovan Liberec (loan)
On 4 August 2020, Slavia loaned Helal to Slovan Liberec with two other players. 22 October 2020, he scored the only goal in a 1–0 win against Gent in the 2020–21 UEFA Europa League.

Persija Jakarta
Helal officially joined the capital club Persija Jakarta on 20 July 2022. On 31 July 2022, he made his league debut by substituted Hanif Sjahbandi in the 64th minute, in a 2–1 winning match againts Persis at Patriot Candrabhaga Stadium.

International career
He represents Bahrain national team since 2012.

Career statistics

Club

International

Scores and results list Bahrain's goal tally first, score column indicates score after each Helal goal.

Honors
East Riffa
Bahraini Second Division League: 2014
Bahraini King's Cup: 2014
Bahraini Super Cup: 2014

Al-Muharraq
Bahraini Premier League: 2017–18

Slavia Prague
Czech First League: 2019–20

Bahrain
GCC U-23 Championship: 2013

References

External links
 

Living people
1993 births
Sportspeople from Manama
Bahraini footballers
Association football forwards
Bahrain international footballers
2015 AFC Asian Cup players
2019 AFC Asian Cup players
Bahraini Premier League players
Czech First League players
Liga 1 (Indonesia) players
East Riffa Club players
Al-Muharraq SC players
Bohemians 1905 players
SK Slavia Prague players
FC Slovan Liberec players
Persija Jakarta players
Bahraini expatriate footballers
Expatriate sportspeople in the Czech Republic
Expatriate footballers in the Czech Republic
Expatriate sportspeople in Indonesia
Expatriate footballers in Indonesia